Acianthus ledwardii was a species of flowering plant in the orchid family Orchidaceae and was endemic to Queensland in Australia but is now presumed extinct. It was a terrestrial herb with a single, heart-shaped leaf and between 2 and 6 transparent, reddish brown flowers.

Description
Acianthus ledwardii was a terrestrial, perennial, deciduous, sympodial herb with a single heart-shaped, glabrous, pale green leaf that was reddish-purple on its lower surface. The flowers were similar to those of the more common Acianthus fornicatus, but the dorsal sepal narrowed abruptly rather than gradually tapered, the lateral sepals had three points on the tip, the petals were broader than those of A. fornicatus, and the labellum was convex on the lower surface, rather than concave.

Taxonomy and naming
Acianthus ledwardii  was first formally described in 1938 by Herman Rupp and the description was published in The Queensland Naturalist from specimens collected by "Dr. C.P. Ledward" near Burleigh Heads in 1934.

Distribution
This orchid is only known from collections made in 1934 and 1938 from Burleigh Heads.

Conservation
Acianthus ledwardii is listed as "extinct" under the Australian Government Environment Protection and Biodiversity Conservation Act 1999.

References 

ledwardii
Orchids of Queensland
Endemic orchids of Australia
Plants described in 1938
Taxa named by Herman Rupp